Kahiri may refer to:
 Kahiri, Chabahar
 Kahiri, Nik Shahr
 Kahiri, S

See also
Karihi